El Harrouch is a district in Skikda Province, Algeria. It is one of the 3 districts in the province that do not lie on the Mediterranean Sea. It was named after its capital, El Harrouch.

Municipalities
The district is further divided into 5 municipalities:
El Harrouch
Zardezas
Salah Bouchaour
Ouled Hebaba
Medjez Eddechiche

Districts of Skikda Province